Ishinsk (Ijı) is a rural locality (a selo) in Choyskoye Rural Settlement of Choysky District, the Altai Republic, Russia. The population was 3 as of 2016.

Geography 
Ishinsk is located on the right bank of the Isha River, 12 km east of Choya (the district's administrative centre) by road. Sovetskoye is the nearest rural locality.

References 

Rural localities in Choysky District